The Tour of Nilgiris is a bicycle tour in India organised by Veloindians.

The tour has been held every year since 2008. The aim of the tour is to promote cycling within the Nilgiris region passing through three Southern states of India Karnataka, Kerala and Tamil Nadu and to revive the cycle culture by popularising cycle as a mode of transport for the twin benefits of easing traffic congestion and being environmental friendly. The event caters for both Charity Riders, Recreational Riders and those looking to move into competitive professional cycling.

The Kalhatty challenge

The hardest part of the tour is the famous and gruelling Kalhatty climb. 12 km of climbing gradients and 36 hairpin bends to gain an altitude of 1,230 m. The average elevation gain is around 10 per cent with a few stretches going up to 15 per cent gradient.

Kalhatti is considered a Hors catégorie climb, which in cycling terms means "something that is beyond categorisation". It is perhaps one of the toughest climbs possible in the sub continent.

Participation

References

Cycling events
Cycle racing in India
Tourism in Karnataka
Tourism in Tamil Nadu
Tourism in Kerala
Tourist attractions in Nilgiris district
Bicycle tours
Adventure tourism in India
Cycle races in India